Trimming the Tree is a Mannheim Steamroller album of Christmas music, released in 2007. It is a compilation album, having copyrights listed as 2001, 2002, 2005 and 2007.  Although released by American Gramaphone as its other albums have been, the album was exclusive to Lowe's, a major home-improvement retailer in the United States It was packaged in shrink wrap (but in separate jewel cases) as a two-disc set, along with Christmas Extraordinaire. It is the third such compilation (after 2005 and 2006) in the Lowe's series, the fourth was Morning Frost in 2008.

Track listing
O Little Town of Bethlehem
Joy to the World
Lo How a Rose E'er Blooming
In Dulci Jubilo
The First Noel
The Holly and the Ivy
Coventry Carol
Rudolph the Red-Nosed Reindeer
Los Peces en el Rio
Away in a Manger

External links
https://web.archive.org/web/20110714030046/http://www.mannheimsteamroller.com/lowes/

2007 Christmas albums
Christmas albums by American artists
Mannheim Steamroller albums
American Gramaphone compilation albums
Classical Christmas albums